The 2019 Australian Football League finals series was the 123rd annual edition of the VFL/AFL final series, the Australian rules football tournament staged to determine the winner of the 2019 AFL Premiership season. The series ran over four weekends in September 2019, culminating with the 2019 AFL Grand Final at the Melbourne Cricket Ground on 28 September 2019.

The top eight teams from the 2019 AFL Premiership season qualify for the finals series. AFL finals series have been played under the current format since 2000.

Qualification

Venues
The matches of the 2019 AFL finals series were contested at four venues around the country.

For the first time since 2009, Brisbane hosted a final, while the Melbourne Cricket Ground hosted five finals, including the 2019 AFL Grand Final. Other finals took place at Perth’s Optus Stadium and at Giants Stadium in Sydney.

Matches

The system used for the 2019 AFL finals series is a final eight system. The top four teams in the eight receive the "double chance" when they play in week-one qualifying finals, such that if a top-four team loses in the first week it still remains in the finals, playing a semi-final the next week against the winner of an elimination final. The bottom four of the eight play knock-out games—only the winners survive and move on to the next week. Home-ground advantage goes to the team with the higher ladder position in the first two weeks, and to the qualifying final winners in the third week.

In the second week, the winners of the qualifying finals receive a bye to the third week. The losers of the qualifying final plays the elimination finals winners in a semi-final. In the third week, the winners of the semi-finals from week two play the winners of the qualifying finals in the first week. The winners of those matches move on to the Grand Final at the MCG in Melbourne.

Week one (qualifying and elimination finals)

First Elimination Final (West Coast vs Essendon)
The opening match of the 2019 AFL finals series saw fifth-placed  host eighth-placed  in the First Elimination Final at Optus Stadium. This marked the sixth final between the two sides, having previously met in a preliminary final in 1990, a qualifying final in 1995, semi-finals in 1993 and 1996, and an elimination final in 2002—with Essendon winning all five. West Coast comfortably beat Essendon by 55 points to advance to the first semi-final.

Scorecard

First Qualifying Final (Geelong vs Collingwood)
The First Qualifying Final saw minor premier  host fourth-placed  at the MCG. This marked the 24th final between the two sides, having met in six grand finals in 1925, 1930, 1937, 1952, 1953 and 2011. In addition, they had contested a qualifying final in 1981, semi finals in 1901, 1927, 1951, 1952, 1953, 1967, and preliminary finals in 1930, 1938, 1955, 1964, 1980, 2007, 2009 and 2010.

Scorecard

Second Elimination Final (Greater Western Sydney vs Western Bulldogs)
The Second Elimination Final saw sixth placed  host seventh placed  at Giants Stadium. The two teams had met in the finals three years previously, with the Bulldogs winning the 2016 First Preliminary Final by six points en route to their drought-breaking premiership win.

Scorecard

Second Qualifying Final (Brisbane Lions vs Richmond)
The Second Qualifying Final saw second placed  host third placed  at The Gabba. Brisbane surged up the ladder in 2019, finishing in the top two for the first time in fifteen years and earning their first finals berth in a decade. This marked the second time the two teams met in a final, having previously clashed in a preliminary final eighteen years prior, which Brisbane won by 68 points en route to their maiden premiership.

Scorecard

Week two (semi-finals)

First Semi-final (Geelong vs West Coast)
The First Semi-final saw  host  at the MCG. This was the sixth meeting between the two clubs in finals, meeting previously in two Grand Finals in 1992 and 1994, a semi-final in 1992, and two preliminary finals in 1991 and 2011. West Coast have won four of the five meetings between the clubs, losing the 2011 preliminary final.

Scorecard

Second Semi-final (Brisbane Lions vs Greater Western Sydney)
The Second Semi-final saw  host  at The Gabba. The two clubs have never met in a final before as the two clubs have never been in a finals series together.

Scorecard

Week three (preliminary finals)

Second Preliminary Final (Richmond vs Geelong)
The Second Preliminary Final saw  host  at the MCG on Friday, 20 September. This was the eleventh final between the two sides and second in three years, having previously met in the finals in 1921, 1931, 1933, 1934, 1967, 1969, 1980, and 1995 and 2017, including grand finals in 1931 and 1967. Head to head in finals it was 8–2 in Richmond's favour, despite Geelong's more recent successes.

Scorecard

First Preliminary Final (Collingwood vs Greater Western Sydney)
The First Preliminary Final saw  host  at the MCG on Saturday, 21 September. This marked the second final between the two teams, having previously clashed in a semi-final the previous season, which was won by Collingwood.

Scorecard

Week four (Grand Final)

This is the first time that  has qualified for the grand final. It was only the second time in AFL/VFL history where neither of the two top qualifying teams made the grand final. The first time this has occurred was in 1980 when  defeated .. This is the second time that  met  in a final. The two teams previously met in a preliminary final in 2017.

References

External links

AFL finals series official website

Finals Series, 2019